Alicia Brandt is a television and film actress. Her most significant roles are that of Joy Foy in the short lived 1992 sitcom Julie, where she starred together with Julie Andrews and James Farentino, and the main character Trudy in the 1993 independent film Losers in Love. Brandt's other roles include appearances on the television series The Golden Girls, Sister, Maybe This Time, Becker, Six Feet Under, Desperate Housewives and Girlfriends.

In addition to her acting career, Ms. Brandt has worked in residential, IOP and detox facilities for chemical and behavioral addiction as clinical director, clinical supervisor, therapist, counselor and trainee.

External links

Year of birth missing (living people)
Living people
American television actresses
American film actresses
21st-century American women